Stratyn (Ukrainian: Стратин,  Stretin) is a village and rural municipality in western Ukraine. It lies in Ivano-Frankivsk Raion of Ivano-Frankivsk Oblast of Ukraine, in the centre of the historic area of Halychyna (Galicia / Galizien / Galicja / Galizia), formerly in Austrian empire (1772–1918), Poland (1365–1772, 1918–1939) and USSR (1939–1941, 1944–1991). The current population is 561 inhabitants. The old name of the village was Striatyn. Stratyn belongs to Rohatyn urban hromada, one of the hromadas of Ukraine.

Geography

Stratyn used to be a town, and it had two parts which were usually referred as Startyn selo / Stratyn the village (Stratyn-wies in Polish) and Stratyn misto / Stratyn the city (Stratyn-miasto). There was a rathaus (city council) in Stratyn during Austrian times. Stratin is Russian name of the village, which is found on some maps from the Soviet period (1939–1941, 1944–1991), while Stratyn is the Ukrainian and Polish name of this village. In Yiddish its name was Strettin / Staretin (hence the Yiddish adjective forms Strettiner, Stretiner, Stratiner, Stratyner). The village is situated in the valley of a small river or brook, surrounded by forests and fields. In 1932, when Stratyn was part of Poland (during 1918–1932), the town status of Stratyn was canceled by the order of the Minister of Internal Affairs of Poland (September 9, 1932).  Prior to this order, Stratyn had just 373 inhabitants (1921) and at the time was the smallest town in the entire Ivano-Frankivsk (Stanislawow) province.

Nowadays, Stratyn is a large village, about 12 km from the district center of Rohatyn.

Nearby locations

 Rohatyn, district center
 Berezhany, city
 Pukiv, village
 Lopushnia, village
 Pidvysoke, village
 Cherche, village and spa resort
 Lviv, the largest city in western Ukraine

History

In this village, around 1600, there was opened one of the first printing houses in Ukraine. The printers who used to work here included Hedeon Balaban, Pamvo Berynda (one of the first printers on Ukrainian lands).  It was namely in 1599 that the third printshop in Ukraine was founded in the village of Stratyn, and another was established in the village of Krylos, near Halych (Galich). There is monument to the Ukrainian writer Taras Shevchenko in Startyn. The last was erected quite recently, after the collapse of Soviet system.

Until 18 July 2020, Stratyn belonged to Rohatyn Raion. The raion was abolished in July 2020 as part of the administrative reform of Ukraine, which reduced the number of raions of Ivano-Frankivsk Oblast to six. The area of Rohatyn Raion was merged into Ivano-Frankivsk Raion.

Jewish community

Stratyn had a Jewish community, that gave name to the Stretiner Hasidic dynasty. At the Jewish cemetery of Startyn there is a grave chapel of Stratyn tsaddik, of so-called Strettener Chasids. Chapel was erected quite recently with efforts being led by R Aharon Yakov Brandwein the previous stretiner Rebba of Borough Park. With much help from the Lviv Jewish Community (by Melekh Sheykhet). In the adjacent table, it is written in Ukrainian to the local village people to honour the place of Jewish righteous zaddiks who will pray for you. To restore these grave monuments of Hassidic tsaddiks, it took much efforts and diligence, as they were deep underneath in the ground already. Prayer books in Hebrew (printed in Israel) are available in the chapel.

The most known Stratyn Hassidic rabbis were rabbi Avrohom (Avraham) of Stretin, rabbi Yehudah Tzvi (Zewi) of Stretin (Yuda Zvi di Stretin in Spanish. He was called the Sage of Stratyn also) and the holy Admor R' Moshe of Stretin.

References

External links
 Website about Stratyn

Villages in Ivano-Frankivsk Raion